Biskett is an 2013 Telugu film produced by Sravanthi and Raj of Godavari Productions. The film is directed by Anil Gopi Reddy. Arvind Krishna is the hero of the film while Dimple Chopade is the leading lady. Jayapal Reddy is the cinematographer and Madhu Reddy is the editor of this film.

Cast 
Arvind Krishna ... Ashwin
 Dimple Chopade (Deeksha)
 Vennela Kishore (Chittilingam)
 M.S. Narayana
 Ali
 Chalapathi Rao
 Thagubothu Ramesh 
 Ajay
 Bharat

Soundtrack  
The audio launch of the film happened in the month of October which was a gala affair and was attended by celebrities like Dil Raju, Veerabhadram Chowdary, Rajam of Namasthe Telangana and state minister D.K. Aruna among others followed by the rest of the cast and crew.

Director Anil Gopireddy also composed tunes for the film. The response to the songs of this film has been very good.

Development  
The film is set to release on 27 December 2013.

References

External links 
 
review
review
2013 films
Indian romantic comedy-drama films
2010s Telugu-language films